Demonetization may refer to one of the following:

Demonetization (currency), the act of stripping a currency unit of its status as legal tender
Demonetization (YouTube), the demonetization of individual videos or entire channels on YouTube